The Bitou Cape is a cape in Ruifang District, New Taipei, Taiwan.

Name
The name Bitou means the tip of the nose in Chinese language.

Geology

The cape is the northeasternmost cape of Taiwan. It is the sea-eroded type of land form, thus it includes several features such as sea cliffs, undercut bluffs and platforms.

Architecture
The cape is equipped with a circular route of walking trail, which starts from Bitou Fishing Port and ends up at Bitou Elementary School. It also houses a military barrack and the Bitoujiao Lighthouse at the end of the cape.

Transportation
The cape is accessible by bus from Taipei Main Station.

See also
 Geology of Taiwan

References

Headlands of Taiwan
Landforms of New Taipei
Tourist attractions in New Taipei